Reluctant Angel is a 1998 Canadian film directed by John Helliker and starring Megan Follows.

Cast
 Megan Follows as Lisa / Cheryl
 Jaimz Woolvett as Donald
 James Gallanders as Jason
 Martin Villafona as Randy
 Anne Marie DeLuise as Carla
 Victor Ertmanis as Leo
 Jeff M. Hall as Gerry
 Paulette Mikuse as Arlene
 J. Winston Carroll as Mr. Levitt
 Simon Sinn as Mr. Chong
 Christina Collins as The Receptionist

References

External links

Canadian crime drama films
1998 films
English-language Canadian films
1990s English-language films
1990s Canadian films